José Artur de Melo Júnior (born 7 March 1987), commonly known as Juninho, is a Brazilian retired footballer who played as a forward.

He was known as Júnior until 2008.

Biography
A youth product of Santos FC, Juninho signed a contract with club since 2004. He made his Campeonato Brasileiro debut on 3 December 2006 (last round), as sub, winning Santa Cruz 3–1. On 1 August 2007 he left for Itumbiara until the end of 2007 Campeonato Brasileiro Série C. He played the last 5 matches of the league stage 2, and scored a goal in the last round. Itumbiara failed to qualify for the next stage (round of 16).

In December, he left for Rio Claro until the end of 2008 Campeonato Paulista. He played 3 time that season, in round 2, 7 and 8.

On 1 May 2009 he signed a 2-year contract with Santo André but loaned to Palestra de São Bernardo of Campeonato Paulista Segunda Divisão, along with team-mate Jefferson and Cadu. They scored a total of 30 goals for the team, over half of team total, finished as losing quarter-finalists.

In July 2010 he left for Sport Barueri until the end of 2010 Copa Paulista. In January 2011 he was signed by Guarani (MG) until the end of 2011 Campeonato Mineiro.

Honours
Campeonato Paulista: 2007

Career statistics

Note: State leagues are marked as League Cup, statistics available only since 2007.
1 6 games 1 goal in 2010 Copa Paulista.

References

External links
 Futpedia 
 
 Photo

1987 births
Living people
Footballers from São Paulo
Brazilian footballers
Association football forwards
Campeonato Brasileiro Série A players
Santos FC players
Itumbiara Esporte Clube players
Rio Claro Futebol Clube players
Esporte Clube Santo André players
Sport Club Barueri players
Brasília Futebol Clube players
Clube Esportivo Lajeadense players
Grêmio Catanduvense de Futebol players
Independente Futebol Clube players